Elio Shazivari (born 14 April 1985) is an Albanian retired footballer who last played as a midfielder for Sopoti Librazhd in the Albanian First Division.

References

External links
 FSHF profile

1985 births
Living people
Footballers from Tirana
Albanian footballers
Association football midfielders
KF Laçi players
KS Shkumbini Peqin players
KF Elbasani players
FK Dinamo Tirana players
KF Korabi Peshkopi players
KS Sopoti Librazhd players
Kategoria Superiore players
Kategoria e Parë players